Warren Airport may refer to:

 Warren Airport (New South Wales) in Warren, New South Wales, Australia (ICAO: YWRN)
 Warren Airport (Ohio) in Warren, Ohio, United States (FAA: 62D)
 Washington–Warren Airport in Washington, North Carolina, United States (ICAO: KOCW)
 Youngstown–Warren Regional Airport in Trumbull County, Ohio, United States (FAA: YNG)
 Warren Airport (Michigan) in Macomb County, Michigan, United States

See also 
 Warren Municipal Airport (disambiguation)
 Warren County Airport (disambiguation)